The  is a novelty toy made by Nintendo in 1969. Designed "for young ladies and men", the device tries to determine how much two people love each other. To operate the device, both users grab one of the connected spherical metal sensors with one hand and hold each other's hands with the other; the meter on the device displays their "love score" on a scale between 1 and 100.

The Love Tester was designed by Gunpei Yokoi (eventual creator of the Game & Watch series and the original Game Boy), who said that he "loved explaining that the meter gave better results when people kissed the girl..." It was the first product by Nintendo to use real electronic components. It was also one of the few products by Nintendo during the 1960s that was sold outside Japan. The device was marketed in Western markets as a "Love/Lie Detector". It was also released as part of a "Mini Game Series", and other versions of the device were packaged differently and contained English instructions. It was advertised heavily on Japanese television, with commercials that have gained a cult following.

In July 2010, the Love Tester was re-released in Japan by Tenyo, featuring the original packaging, and officially endorsed by Nintendo. Website Destructoid reported in 2010 that the device sells for US$55. The Love Tester is considered one of the most sought-after products from Nintendo's earlier years and is considered one of the most unusual products created by Nintendo.

The Love Tester was featured as a "DooDad" in WarioWare: Twisted for the Game Boy Advance and as the "Prototype Detector" in Pikmin 2 for the GameCube and Wii. It also appears as a collectible item in Animal Crossing: New Leaf and can be found as an Easter egg in The Legend of Zelda: Majora's Mask 3D. Furthermore, in Chee-Chai Alien for the Game Boy Color, Chailien No. 113 Rabuta (ラブタ) is a Love Tester with arms and legs. In WarioWare Gold, the Love Tester was featured as a collectable and also an upgraded version called Love Tester 2.0 appears but acts different. One player must draw half a heart while the other finishes it showing the love score. A software remake of the Love Tester, called the Compat-I-Com, appears as a Gaddget in Mario Party Advance for the Game Boy Advance.

See also
Love tester machine
List of Nintendo products

References

 
Nintendo toys
1960s toys
Electronic toys